ABBA: You Can Dance is a dance rhythm game for the Wii, developed and published by the French gaming company Ubisoft. It was released on November 15, 2011, in North America, November 24, 2011 in Australia and November 25, 2011, in Europe. The game is a spin-off of the Just Dance series, and features 26 songs by the Swedish pop group ABBA and includes a "Karaoke Mode" which allows 2 players to sing via USB microphones.

Gameplay
The game is based on Ubisoft's concept franchise, Just Dance and uses very similar style of play to the Wii version of Michael Jackson: The Experience. It includes one main game mode, where players have to follow the moves of a member of the Swedish pop group ABBA or non-ABBA character. It also includes a "Mini Musical Mode" which is a story mode that has six songs in the same story. The game also includes a "Karaoke Mode" which allows 2 players to sing along to the lyrics via USB microphones.

Track listing
The game features 26 songs, all by the Swedish pop group ABBA.

Easter eggs
Several images of the ABBA logo can be seen in some of the songs:
"Gimme! Gimme! Gimme! (A Man After Midnight)" - a poster of the "ABBA: The Album" album can be seen on the wall at the start of the song.
"As Good as New" - the dancer is wearing a shirt with the "ABBA: The Album" album artwork on it.
"Honey, Honey" - a small ABBA poster can be seen on the women's side of the stage.

Reception

Metacritic lists the game with an aggregate score of 66 out of 100.

See also
SingStar ABBA
Just Dance 2014
Just Dance Now
Just Dance 2018

References

2011 video games
ABBA
Band-centric video games
Dance video games
Just Dance (video game series)
Music video games
Video games based on musicians
Ubisoft games
Video games developed in France
Video games developed in Romania
Wii games
Wii-only games